Uargon, New South Wales is a bounded rural locality of Gilgandra Shire and a civil parish of Gowen County, New South Wales.

The Parish is on the Uargon Creek and the nearest settlement of the parish is Tooraweenah, New South Wales to the south.

References

Localities in New South Wales
Geography of New South Wales
Central West (New South Wales)